The house at 235–237 Reynolds Street is a historic home located at Rochester in Monroe County, New York. It was constructed between 1880 and 1885 as a multi-family dwelling and is an unusual example of High Victorian Gothic style residential architecture in Rochester's Eighth Ward.  It is a modestly sized two-bay, two-story brick structure that features asymmetrical massing and verticality and elongation of architectural elements.

It was listed on the National Register of Historic Places in 1985.

References

Houses in Rochester, New York
Houses on the National Register of Historic Places in New York (state)
Gothic Revival architecture in New York (state)
Houses completed in 1885
National Register of Historic Places in Rochester, New York